"Change the Beat" is a song written and recorded by Fab Five Freddy, and one of the most sampled songs in music history.  

It was recorded at Martin Bisi's OAO Studio in Brooklyn, New York, United States, (later, BC Studio) and released as a 12" single on the Celluloid label in 1982.  This release and all subsequent pressings of the single feature two versions of the song, one on Side A and one on Side B.  The official length of the tracks varies depending on the specific pressing of the single, with some releases mislabeling the running times entirely.  The Side A version is 7:40 minutes in length and features Fab Five Freddy rapping in both English and French.  He also performs the chorus of the song, utilizing a vocoder with a white noise carrier to achieve a gritty, robotic effect.  The version of the song that appears on Side B is considerably shorter than the A-side track, clocking in at 3:42.  Aside from the chorus, which, like the Side A, was performed by Fab Five Freddy through the vocoder, the lead vocals are performed by rapper Beside and rapped entirely in French, making this single one of the first multilingual hip-hop releases.  Beside was credited as 'Fab 5 Betty' on the earliest pressings of the vinyl.

At the end of the Side B version, there appears the phrase "Ahhhhh, this stuff is really fresh", spoken through a vocoder. The first and last words are two of the most widely used samples for scratching. According to WhoSampled, a user-generated website cataloging samples, Change the Beat is one of the three most sampled tracks in history, appearing in over 2600 tracks as of 2022. The earliest of which was the 1983 Herbie Hancock single "Rockit", which featured scratching by pioneering DJ and turntablist Grandmixer DXT (then known as GrandMixer D.ST).

Although most people familiar with the record believe the sample comes from the processed voice of Fab Five Freddy, that account is disputed by producer Bill Laswell, one of the musicians credited on the record.  Laswell states that it was his manager Roger Trilling who recorded the sample during earlier sessions for another project.  According to both Laswell and Trilling himself, Trilling was imitating a record executive who would reportedly exclaim "this stuff is really fresh!" whenever he heard a song he liked.  The sample, then, is an imitation of this executive by Roger Trilling and spoken through a vocoder.

References

External links
 Listing of sampling songs
 Origins of the sample

1982 singles
1982 songs
American hip hop songs
Sampling (music)
Song recordings produced by Bill Laswell
Songs written by Fab Five Freddy